Maxwell Milton Rabb (September 28, 1910 – June 9, 2002) was a lawyer who served in various positions as an advisor to U.S. President Dwight D. Eisenhower, and later as Ambassador to Italy under President Ronald Reagan.

Rabb was born in Boston, Massachusetts and earned an A.B. and an LLB from Harvard University in 1932 and 1935, respectively.

From 1937 to 1943, Rabb served as administrative assistant (secretary) to U.S. Senator Henry Cabot Lodge Jr. of Massachusetts. In 1944, when Lodge left the Senate, Rabb briefly worked as an administrative assistant for Lodge's successor as U.S. Senator, Sinclair Weeks.

From 1944 to 1946, Rabb joined the United States Navy Reserve and served as a lieutenant. In 1946 he would also serve as legal consultant to United States Secretary of the Navy James Forrestal.

Rabb got involved in the Eisenhower for President campaign in late 1951 and worked full-time for the campaign in 1952. In January 1953 he joined the White House staff as aide to Sherman Adams and counsel to the President, and in 1954 he became Secretary to the Cabinet (or Cabinet Secretary), a position he held until he resigned in 1958. Throughout all his time in the White House, Rabb was viewed as the staff member in charge of minority affairs. Correspondence, reports, and printed materials involving Jewish issues, African-Americans, civil rights, segregation, integration, anti-Semitism, refugees, and immigration were often referred to Rabb.
 
Following his resignation in 1958, Rabb became chairman of the U.S. delegation to the 1958 UNESCO Conference in Paris.

Rabb was a partner in the New York City law firm of Stroock & Stroock & Lavan before returning to public life and serving as the United States Ambassador to Italy from 1981 to 1989.  During his tenure as Ambassador he was accused by the actor Nico Minardos of sanctioning, on behalf of the U.S. Government, an arms deal with Iran during a meeting between Rabb and Minardos at the U.S. Embassy in Rome.  At the time, Minardos was involved in business dealings with famed Saudi arms merchant Adnan Khashoggi.  Rabb emphatically denied his involvement and ultimately he was not required to testify after the criminal indictment against Minardos and others was dismissed by U.S. Attorney Rudy Giuliani in the wake of the Iran-Contra scandal.

References

External links
 Papers of Maxwell Rabb, Dwight D. Eisenhower Presidential Library

|-

1910 births
2002 deaths
Ambassadors of the United States to Italy
Eisenhower administration cabinet members
Harvard Law School alumni
Jewish American attorneys
Massachusetts Republicans
United States Navy officers
20th-century American diplomats